Transpower may refer to:

 Transpower New Zealand, a transmission system operator in New Zealand
 Transpower Stromübertragungs GmbH, a subsidiary of TenneT, a transmission system operator in Germany
 Transpower (character), a fictional superhero of League of Champions